
The following lists events that happened during 1824 in South Africa.

Events
 Bergenaar Rebellion
 George Thompson travels inland and names the Augrabies Falls the Cataract of King George
 A road is built through the Fransch Hoek Pass
 30 January - Lord Charles Henry Somerset issues a proclamation prohibiting the use of Dutch in legal courts, starting on the 1 March
  5 March - The South African Journal and the Zuid-Afrikaansche Tijdschrift is launched in Cape Town
 27 August -Francis Farewell hoists the Union Jack at Port Natal  after the Zulu king, Shaka, grants the port to establish a trading post

References
See Years in South Africa for list of References

 
South Africa
Years in South Africa